Aleiphaquilon una is a species of beetle in the family Cerambycidae. It was described by Mermudes and Monné in 1999.

References

Neocorini
Beetles described in 1999